That Ain't Love may refer to:

"That Ain't Love", hit song by REO Speedwagon from album  Life as We Know It
"That Ain't Love", song by Raz Simone
"That Ain't Love", song by King Bees (band) 1966
"That Ain't Love", song by Robert Cray from Twenty (Robert Cray album)
"That Ain't Love", song by Hard Rain from Hard Rain (Hard Rain album)